Navan Junction was a railway station serving the town of Navan in County Meath. As the name suggests, the station was located at the junction of two railway lines. The first was a branch line off the main line between Belfast and Dublin, which connected Drogheda and Oldcastle, and opened in 1850. The second, which opened in 1862, was also a branch line, this time off the line from Dublin to Sligo, connecting Clonsilla and Navan. This line was later extended as far as Kingscourt in 1865.

Although Navan had two railway stations, Navan Junction was the main one serving the town, with a total of four platforms serving the two routes. However, following the nationalisation of the railways in Ireland in 1945, a major rationalisation programme led to the closure of many branch lines. Passenger services on the Kingscourt line ended in 1947, and led to the line between Clonsilla and Navan being lifted, while services on the Oldcastle line ended in 1958, with the line between Navan and Oldcastle lifted in 1963. This saw the final closure of Navan Junction station itself. 

Today, little remains of the station. Most of the buildings have been demolished, with the exception of the Midland Great Western Railway goods shed and the Great Northern Railway (Ireland) down platform. However, freight trains still pass through the site - until 2001, trains transported gypsum from the Gypsum Industries plant at Kingscourt through the site, while trains from the Tara Mine continue to use the remaining part of the Oldcastle line to transport zinc and lead to Drogheda.

References

1850 establishments in Ireland
Railway Station Junction
Disused railway stations in County Meath
Railway stations closed in 1963
Railway stations opened in 1850
Junction Railway Station
Railway stations in the Republic of Ireland opened in 1850